La Batterie is a village in north-western Mauritania on the Ras Nouadhibou peninsular. It is located in the Nouadhibou Department in the Dakhlet Nouadhibou region south of Nouadhibou close to Cansado.

Populated places in Mauritania
Dakhlet Nouadhibou Region